Neoklis is a masculine Greek given name. Notable people with the name include:

Neoklis Kazazis (1849–1936), Greek lawyer, academic and writer
Neoklis Kyriazis (1877–1956), Cypriot historian
Neoklis Sarris (1940–2011), Greek academic, jurist and politician
Neoklis Sylikiotis (born 1959), Cypriot politician

Greek masculine given names